Scientometrics is a monthly peer-reviewed academic journal covering the field of scientometrics. It publishes original studies, short communications, review papers, letters to the editor, and book reviews. It is published by Akadémiai Kiadó and Springer Science+Business Media and was established in 1978. Its founder and first editor-in-chief was Tibor Braun.

Abstracting and indexing
This journal is abstracted and indexed in:

According to the Journal Citation Reports, the journal has a 2020 impact factor of 3.238.

Plagiarism case
Jeffrey Beall reported that the editor of Scientometrics initially reacted indifferently to the discovery of extended word-for-word plagiarism in a 2013 article. The authors in question had copied material from a source and provided a citation, but had not used quotation marks. In the end, the article was retracted.

References

External links 

Derek John de Solla Price Medal of the journal Scientometrics; International Society for Scientometrics and Informetrics

Springer Science+Business Media academic journals
Information science journals
Publications established in 1978
Monthly journals
English-language journals
Akadémiai Kiadó academic journals